The following is an episode list of Bonkers, an American animated television series that first aired from September 4, 1993, to February 23, 1994, and then continued airing as reruns until 1995 on The Disney Afternoon (with select episodes airing on The Disney Channel from February to June 1993 as a preview for the series). The series was set in a Roger Rabbit-like world where "toons" and humans co-exist.

The premise of the series was that Bonkers D. Bobcat, an anthropomorphic bobcat who was a popular cartoon star (he appeared in Disney's Raw Toonage shorts in the fictional world of Bonkers as well) had washed out of show business and became a cop. He was made the junior partner of Detective Lucky Piquel, a grim and ill-tempered human who hates toons. Throughout the series, the pair work together to solve crimes in the Hollywood, Los Angeles, California region. Bonkers repeatedly tried to win Piquel's praise, but usually just ended up ruining missions with his antics.

After some years of working with Bonkers, Piquel was given an FBI job in Washington, D.C., and with great glee was finally able to leave Bonkers, but finally realized that after all the time spent hating working with Bonkers, he had grown to love him. At the end of the "Lucky" episodes, Bonkers was given a new partner, the attractive Sergeant Miranda Wright. Although also human, she was far more patient and tolerant of his antics than was Piquel. With Miranda, Bonkers was more the brunt of the slapstick.

Broadcast chronology
Bonkers''' 65 episodes all aired on The Disney Afternoon during the 1993–94 television season. However, the series can be broken up into multiple groups of episodes, based on when they originally aired and from which set of episodes they came (i.e., the Lucky Piquel episodes, the Miranda Wright episodes, or the Raw Toonage compilation episodes).

Nine of the 19 Miranda Wright episodes first aired on The Disney Channel between February and June 1993 as a preview for the series. These are referred to here as "Group 1."

The syndicated run of the show began with a special hour-long airing of the Lucky Piquel pilot story ("Going Bonkers"/"Gone Bonkers"), that aired the weekend before the series' Disney Afternoon premiere. This first episode was later split into two parts, which are treated as separate episodes. Nineteen more Lucky episodes subsequently premiered in September and October 1993. These 21 episodes are referred to here as "Group 2."

In October 1993, the 19 Miranda Wright episodes aired on The Disney Afternoon, preceded by a special crossover episode, "New Partners on the Block," which tied the previously produced Miranda episodes into the continuity of the Lucky Piquel episodes. Along with the 9 Miranda episodes previously shown on The Disney Channel, 10 more Miranda episodes made their debut. The 10 new Miranda episodes, along with "New Partners on the Block," are referred to here as "Group 3."

In November 1993, 20 more Lucky Piquel episodes began airing on The Disney Afternoon. Fifteen of them premiered in November, with the last 5 being held over until February 1994 (most likely to coincide with the February ratings sweeps). The last 20 Lucky episodes are referred to here as "Group 4."

In addition, four compilation episodes, featuring the Bonkers segments from Raw Toonage'' were interspersed among the other episodes. These episodes are listed separately.

When the series went into reruns, the Lucky Piquel and Miranda Wright episodes were usually rerun separately (i.e., all of the Lucky episodes, then all of the Miranda episodes, then the Lucky episodes again, etc.), even if the episodes were rerun out of order. (The compilation episodes would be rerun with the Lucky episodes, then All the Miranda Episodes aired last again.)

Each episode was given a production code by Walt Disney Television Animation. These codes are in the format "4311-xxx"; the Miranda episodes are numbered "4311-0xx", while the Lucky episodes (along with "New Partners on the Block" and the compilation episodes) are numbered "4311-1xx." The Miranda episodes' production numbers are not consecutive; several numbers are skipped over. The production codes have been sourced from the individual episode registration records in the U.S. Copyright Office catalog. (Since not all of these episode records have a listed production code, and because of the skips in the Miranda episode numbering, the codes for "The Stork Exchange" and "Toon for a Day" are not known.)

In addition, Disney's distribution arm Buena Vista Television used a different numbering system, with all of the Lucky Piquel episodes in production code order, followed by "New Partners on the Block", then all of the Miranda Wright episodes in production code order, with the four compilation episodes randomly interspersed among the Lucky episodes (except for "If," which is placed between "New Partners on the Block" and the rest of the Miranda episodes). BVTV's episode codes carry the prefix "BK-xx". This numbering was also the order generally used when the series was broadcast outside of North America, except with "Going Bonkers" and "Gone Bonkers" moved to the beginning of the order. The resultant "international" order (excluding the compilation episodes) perhaps most closely reflects the series' in-universe chronology.

Series overview

Episodes

Group 1 (1993) (Miranda Wright)

Group 2 (1993) (Lucky Piquel)

Group 3 (1993) (Miranda Wright)

Group 4 (1993–94) (Lucky Piquel)

Compilations

References

External links
 Comprehensive episode guide with original airdates: 
  (in U.S. syndication air order)
 
 Episode list in German at Zeichentrickserien.de (in Disney's "international" episode order)

Bonkers (TV series)
Lists of American children's animated television series episodes